Shock Treatment is a 1981 American dark comedy musical film, a follow-up to The Rocky Horror Picture Show.

Shock Treatment may also refer to:

Film and television
 Shock Treatment (1964 film), an American neo noir drama 
 Shock Treatment (1969 film), or On the Reeperbahn at Half Past Midnight 
 Shock Treatment (1973 film), a French drama
 Shock Treatment (1995 film), a TV film
 Shock Treatment (TV series), a 2005 reality entertainment documentary

Music
 Shock Treatment (Belfast band)
 Shock Treatment (Don Ellis album), 1968
 Shock Treatment (Edgar Winter album), 1974
 Shock Treatment (Krizz Kaliko album), 2010

See also

Shock therapy (disambiguation)